1st Independent Division of Hebei Provincial Military District was formed in July 1966 basing on six independent infantry regiment (1st to 6th) and independent infantry company of Hebei Provincial Military District.

In March 1969 it renamed as Independent Division of Hebei Provincial Military District() following 2nd Independent Division of Hebei Provincial Military District's transfer to Shanxi. By then the division was composed of five infantry regiments (1st to 5th).

In April 1974 3rd Infantry Regiment detached from the division and became as 14th Regiment, 4th Garrison Division of Beijing Military Region.

In March 1976 Artillery Regiment was activated.

In March 1977 4th Infantry Regiment was detached.

In December 1980 the division was re-organized and renamed as 7th Garrison Division of Beijing Military Region() and moved to Chengde, Hebei province. 2nd Infantry Regiment was detached. The division was then composed of:
1st Infantry Regiment;
5th Infantry Regiment;
Artillery Regiment.

The division was under operational command of 24th Army.

The division was reduced to 7th Garrison Brigade of Beijing Military Region() in 1985.

The brigade was disbanded in 1992.

References
中国各省军区独立师的历史沿革, https://web.archive.org/web/20160918225002/http://www.360doc.com/content/13/1205/20/1164894_334784330.shtml

G7B
Military units and formations established in 1966
Military units and formations disestablished in 1992